Lieutenant General Colin Campbell (1754–1814) was Lieutenant Governor of Gibraltar.

Military career
Campbell was commissioned into the 71st Regiment of Foot in 1771 and then transferred to the 6th Regiment of Foot in 1783. In 1796 he went to Ireland and two years later fought at the Battle of Vinegar Hill.

In 1810 he was appointed Lieutenant Governor of Gibraltar. During the Peninsular War he insisted on keeping Gibraltar well garrisoned and also regarded Tarifa as within his command and denied it to the French invading force there.

His son Guy Campbell was created a Baronet in his honour in 1815.

References

|-
 

1754 births
1814 deaths
British Army lieutenant generals
Governors of Gibraltar
71st Highlanders officers
People of the Irish Rebellion of 1798
Royal Warwickshire Fusiliers officers
British Army personnel of the Napoleonic Wars
18th-century British Army personnel